The John A. Lynch Sr. Memorial Bridge is a bridge on Route 18 in the U.S. state of New Jersey spanning the Raritan River. The bridge connects Piscataway Township on the north with New Brunswick on the south.

History
Construction on the bridge had begun back in the late 1960s with the announcement of Route 18's upgrade to a freeway between New Brunswick and Middlesex, and by 1970, the bridge piers were in place. However, environmental concerns stalled the construction of the Route 18 freeway for almost a decade, and the piers stood unfinished until 1983 when the freeway and bridge were finally completed as far as River Road in Piscataway.

The bridge was originally known as the Raritan River Bridge, but was renamed in honor of John A. Lynch Sr., the former State Senator from the district that included New Brunswick and Piscataway, a former mayor of New Brunswick, and the father and namesake of John A. Lynch Jr., who held those positions at the time of the bridge's completion.

See also
 List of crossings of the Raritan River

References

External links
 Route 18 page at nycroads.com, with pictures and information on the John Lynch Bridge
 Route 18/Elmer Boyd Memorial Parkway page at njfreeways.com, with pictures of the John Lynch Bridge

Bridges over the Raritan River
Bridges completed in 1983
Road bridges in New Jersey
Bridges in Middlesex County, New Jersey
Piscataway, New Jersey
New Brunswick, New Jersey